Cédric Djeugoué (born 28 August 1992) is a Cameroonian international footballer who plays for Forest Rangers as a centre back.

Club career
Born in Mankwa, Djeugoué spent his early career with ASPORES and Kadji SA. He then played with Foullah Edifice in Chad, with Douala AC and Coton Sport in Cameroon, and with IR Tanger in Morocco.

He was close to signing for Malaysian club Kelantan FA in January 2017, but the deal fell through due to issues with his documentation.

After leaving Tanger he played for New Star de Douala, UMS de Loum and Forest Rangers.

International career
Djeugoué made his international debut for Cameroon on 10 August 2013, starting in a 0–1 loss against Gabon.

He was selected as part of Cameroon's squad for the 2014 FIFA World Cup, and the 2015 Africa Cup of Nations.

References

1992 births
Living people
Cameroonian footballers
Cameroon international footballers
Kadji Sports Academy players
Foullah Edifice FC players
Douala Athletic Club players
Coton Sport FC de Garoua players
Ittihad Tanger players
New Star de Douala players
UMS de Loum players
Forest Rangers F.C. players
Association football fullbacks
Cameroonian expatriate footballers
Cameroonian expatriate sportspeople in Chad
Expatriate footballers in Chad
Cameroonian expatriate sportspeople in Morocco
Expatriate footballers in Morocco
Cameroonian expatriate sportspeople in Zambia
Expatriate footballers in Zambia
2014 FIFA World Cup players
2015 Africa Cup of Nations players